The 1987 Volta a Catalunya was the 67th edition of the Volta a Catalunya cycle race and was held from 9 September to 17 September 1987 with a total of 8 stages. The race started in Sant Sadurní d'Anoia and finished in Platja d'Aro. The race was won by Galician Álvaro Pino from the BH team. Ángel Arroyo from Reynolds-Seur team and Iñaki Gastón from Kas team were second and third in the race.

The eighth stage, divided in two sectors, had two individual Time Trials, one in San Sadurní de Noya and the other in Bañolas.

Álvaro Pino won his only lap when he was going through a tendinitis.

General classification

References

1987
Volta
1987 in Spanish road cycling
September 1987 sports events in Europe
1987 Super Prestige Pernod International